Tanel Kurbas (born 8 May 1988) is an Estonian professional basketball player for Kalev/Cramo of the Korvpalli Meistriliiga. Standing at 1.97 m (6 ft 6 in), he plays at the shooting guard and small forward positions. He also represents the Estonian national basketball team internationally.

Professional career
Kurbas began playing basketball with Tiit Sokk's basketball school. He made his Korvpalli Meistriliiga (KML) debut in the 2005–06 season with Noortekoondis/Audentes. In 2006, he joined Dalkia/Nybit.

In 2008, Kurbas signed for Kalev. He won his first Estonian Championship in the 2008–09 season. Kurbas averaged 8.3 points and 2.4 rebounds per game.

On 22 July 2010, Kurbas signed for Estonian champions Tartu Ülikool. In the 2013–14 season, Kurbas averaged 9 points, 2.2 rebounds and 1.6 assists per game and was named to the All-KML Team. He won his second Estonian Championship in the 2014–15 season, after TÜ/Rock defeated Kalev/Cramo in the finals, winning the series 4 games to 1. Kurbas was named KML Finals Most Valuable Player.

On 26 July 2016, Kurbas signed a one-year contract with Swedish champions Södertälje Kings.

Estonian national team
As a member of the senior Estonian national basketball team, Kurbas competed at the EuroBasket 2015. During the tournament, he averaged 5.3 points, 2 rebounds, 1 assist in 19.3 minutes per game. Estonia finished the tournament in 20th place.

Awards and accomplishments

Professional career
Kalev
 Estonian League champion: 2009, 2019
 Estonian Cup champion: 2008, 2020

University of Tartu
 Estonian League champion: 2015
 4× Estonian Cup champion: 2010, 2011, 2013, 2014

Patrioti Levice
 Slovak League champion: 2018

Individual
 KML Finals Most Valuable Player: 2015
 All-KML Team: 2014

References

External links
 Tanel Kurbas at basket.ee 
 Tanel Kurbas at fiba.com

1988 births
Living people
BC Kalev/Cramo players
Estonian men's basketball players
GTK Gliwice players
BK Patrioti Levice players
Korvpalli Meistriliiga players
Shooting guards
Small forwards
Södertälje Kings players
Basketball players from Tallinn
Tartu Ülikool/Rock players